Dębogórze  is a village in the administrative district of Gmina Kosakowo, within Puck County, Pomeranian Voivodeship, in northern Poland.

For details of the history of the region, see History of Pomerania.

The village has a population of 962.

Notable residents
 Jan Radtke (1872-1958), first voigt of Gdynia
 Heinrich von Tiedemann (1840-1922), Politician
 Bartek Stankiewicz (1995-)

References

Villages in Puck County